Sarah James may refer to:

Sarah James (born 1946), environmental activist
Sarah Beth James (born 1989), American beauty pageant titleholder
Sarah James (The 4400), 4400 character